The Mitchell Institute is a 501(c)(3) non-profit organization headquartered in Portland, Maine. Its mission is to increase the likelihood that young people from Maine will aspire to, pursue and achieve a college education.

The Institute was founded by George J. Mitchell and is supported by donors throughout Maine. The Institute features a quotation from George J. Mitchell that "no one should be guaranteed success ... but everyone should have a fair chance to succeed."

Scholarships for residents of Maine 
Each year "Mitchell Scholars" are awarded annual scholarships on the basis of academic potential, community service, and financial need. Recipients must be residents of Maine who will be entering their first year of an accredited college or university. Beginning in 2006 the scholarship award is $1,250 a year for up to four years. In addition the Institute also grants "Pioneer Scholarship Awards".

The scholarships are not to be confused with the Mitchell Scholarships granted by the US-Ireland Alliance.

Great Maine Schools Project  
The Institute also operates the Great Maine Schools Project, a statewide high school reform initiative. It is funded by a grant from the Bill & Melinda Gates Foundation.

References

External links 
 

Non-profit organizations based in Maine
Organizations established in 1999
Scholarships
1999 establishments in Maine